This Is Berkeley Not West Bay is an extended play released on June 1, 1994 by Zafio Records. It features AFI, Black Fork, Dead and Gone and Screw 32. There were 2 identical pressings in 1994 and 1995, both on black vinyl. The first was 2,000, the 2nd was 1,000.

The title and the cover of the EP is based on the Boston hardcore compilation This Is Boston, Not L.A.. Zafio Records co-founder Jesse Luscious loved the original Boston compilation so much he chose to pay homage to it through this release of 4 of the best young east bay punk bands of the time. It was the first or close to the first official release of each band. All 4 were growing in popularity in the local do-it-yourself punk scene at 924 Gilman Street in Berkeley, California.

The EP was reissued in 2011 on Zafio Records by Jesse Luscious in a one-time repressing of 1, 000 copies on white vinyl. Each copy was hand-numbered and contained a free mp3 version of the 4 songs. The EP was remixed by Noah Landis and remastered by George Horn of Fantasy Studios.

The AFI song "Love Is a Many Splendored Thing" was re-recorded for AFI's album Very Proud of Ya, but was only featured on the vinyl version.

Track listing

Personnel 
Credits adapted from liner notes.

 Kevin Army – sequencing
 Christopher – cover
 Murray Bowles – photography
 John Galden – mastering
 Noah Landis – remastering

AFI 
 Adam Carson – drums
 Tim Armstrong – producer
 Davey Havok – vocals
 Andy Ernst – recording
 Geoff Kresge – bass
 Lint – guest vocals
 Markus Stopholese – guitar
 Brett Reed – producer

Studios
 Recorded at The Art of Ears

References 

1994 EPs